Gaujiena is a village along the Gauja River in Gaujiena Parish, Smiltene Municipality, Latvia. It was the seat of a Komtur of the Teutonic Knights. The Gaujiena Castle was erected in the 13th century, but fell into disrepair in the 18th century.

Gallery

References

Towns and villages in Latvia
Castles of the Teutonic Knights
Kreis Walk
Smiltene Municipality
Vidzeme